The California Department of Justice is a statewide investigative law enforcement agency and legal department of the California executive branch under the elected leadership of the California Attorney General (AG) which carries out complex criminal and civil investigations, prosecutions, and other legal services throughout the US state of California. The department is equivalent to the State Bureau of Investigation in other states.

Description

As California's top-level investigative law enforcement agency and legal department, CA DOJ has statewide authority with over 4,700 employees and a budget of US$1.048 billion in 2019. Last data is that governor's budget proposes $1.2 billion to support DOJ operations in 2022‑23—an increase of $40 million (or 3.4 percent)—over the revised amount for 2021‑22. Besides its support of the California Attorney General, the department is frequently mentioned in the news media for (among other activities):
 Its assistance to federal law enforcement agencies, for example, CA DOJ Special Agents working alongside their federal counterparts on cases and while federalized on several different task forces.
 Its forensic laboratory work that processes evidence from multiple agencies throughout the state. 
 Its statistics, for example, on weapons sales in California.
 Its assistance to the local law enforcement agencies, for example, on cases too large or complex for local agencies to handle alone, or use of CA DOJ databases.

Special agents

The sworn law enforcement personnel of CA DOJ (primarily assigned to the Division of Law Enforcement), consists of approximately 400 law enforcement officers (Special Agents). They make up a group a criminal investigators with varied backgrounds in law enforcement and intelligence agencies. This small, but elite, group of sworn peace officers are generally better educated and more experienced than many of their law-enforcement counterparts, and are often called upon for their expertise and ability to coordinate joint activities between local, state, and federal agencies throughout the state. Special Agents are a force multiplier, assisting agencies with expertise, equipment and personnel. Whether running a narcotic task force, investigating a murder, uncovering political corruption, bringing human traffickers to justice, or disrupting violent gangs, CA DOJ Special Agents consistently conduct a variety of law enforcement investigative activities at multiple levels. Additionally, CA DOJ Special Agents are often federally deputized/cross-sworn as federal agents in order to allow them to complete cases outside of California or to participate in federal task forces. They are also frequently chosen by their peer agencies as the lead group in multi-jurisdictional cases. Small and large law enforcement agencies within California can request assistance from CA DOJ.

History

While the California Office of the Attorney General was created in 1850, the law enforcement and criminal investigative capabilities of the CA DOJ were not fully established until the early 20th century. However, the mission of CA DOJ Special Agents mirrors that of the original California Rangers, the first statewide criminal investigative and law enforcement agency created on May 17, 1853. Although the California Rangers were quickly disbanded following their success in bringing the violent Five Joaquins gang to justice, their special law enforcement capabilities and statewide investigative mission have been primarily transferred to the Special Agents of CA DOJ.

Special Agent Rank Classifications

 Special Agent Trainee
 Special Agent
 Special Agent Supervisor
 Special Agent in-Charge
 Assistant Director
 Bureau Director
 Deputy Chief
 Division Chief

Divisions

Division of Law Enforcement

Overview
The Division of Law Enforcement (CA DOJ DLE) is the primary law enforcement branch of the California Department of Justice. The division is not only the largest within the department, but also one of the largest statewide investigative law enforcement agencies in the United States. Its staff consists of sworn law enforcement officers (Special Agents), criminalists/forensic scientists, analysts, and other professional personnel. The primary mission of the Division of Law Enforcement is to enhance public safety by conducting criminal investigations, regulatory oversight, and forensic analysis of evidence for criminal proceedings. The division also assists local, state and federal agencies by providing services in specialized areas including:

 Investigation of complex crimes
 Collection and analysis of evidence
 Training and education
 Enforcing state gambling and firearm laws and regulations
 Computer forensic training

Investigative Bureaus

California Bureau of Investigation
The California Bureau of Investigation (CBI), was established in 1918 as the California Bureau of Criminal Identification and Investigation (CBCII). CBCII, along with the disbanded California Bureau of Narcotic Enforcement (BNE) which was created in 1927 (the remainder of BNE merged with CBI in 2012), provided the state with its initial criminal investigative law enforcement capabilities and is considered the direct predecessor to the modern day CBI—the oldest, continuously operating, law enforcement investigative bureau/agency within CA DOJ, and the state. The CBI provides statewide expert investigative services through special agents combating multi-jurisdictional criminal organizations, and also operates several programs including a Special Operations Unit (SOU) primarily handling violent gang and murder investigations assisting local agencies, a Special Investigations Team (SIT) handling high-profile criminal and civil investigations, an Electronics Crime Unit handling cyber-based and/or electronic crimes including hacking and fraud, the state task force program, LA CLEAR, and the state anti-terrorism program. As the state's FBI counterpart, the CBI investigates a wide-variety of crimes including homicides, fraud, sexual predators, violent/repeat offenders, serial crimes, internet crimes against children, human trafficking, money laundering, extortion, public corruption, rapes, false imprisonment, terrorism, and much more.

Bureau of Firearms
The California Bureau of Firearms (BOF), "is responsible for identifying individuals who are ineligible to acquire or possess firearms" and other weapons, primarily targeting felons and others that may be in possession of illegal weapons/explosives. The BOF conducts a variety of operations, including undercover investigations for violations of state firearms laws, training local law-enforcement officials on firearms law and regulations, inspecting licensed firearms dealers, lending safety assistance to gun show promoters, locating and arresting felons in possession of firearms, and testifying as expert witnesses. The BOF also works closely with its federal counterparts in the US Bureau of Alcohol, Tobacco, Firearms and Explosives (ATF).

Bureau of Gambling Control
The California Bureau of Gambling Control (BGC) "regulates legal gambling activities." The BGC investigates casinos and card clubs throughout California for violations of California's gaming laws. Violation of state gaming laws by casinos and clubs as well as their employees and customers are the focus of most BGC investigations. They also investigate complex thefts, robberies, scams and other crimes related to the casinos and clubs.

Bureau of Forensic Services
The California Bureau of Forensic Services (BFS) is the scientific arm of the department, whose mission is to serve the people of California on behalf of the Attorney General's Office with state of the art forensic services throughout the state. Forensic scientists collect, analyze, and compare physical evidence from suspected crimes via some of the most well-equipped and accredited forensic science laboratories in the country. The BFS regional laboratory system was established in 1972.

Division of California Justice Information Services

The Division of California Justice Information (CJIS) "facilitates the exchange of criminal justice intelligence among law enforcement agencies"

Division of Criminal Law

Overview
The Division of Criminal Law "represent[s] the People of the State of California in criminal cases."

DCL Sections and Investigative Bureaus

Division of Medi-Cal Fraud & Elder Abuse
The Division of Medi-Cal Fraud & Elder Abuse (DMFEA) protects California's most vulnerable citizens and helps to safeguard the state's Medi-Cal program. The Division of Medi-Cal Fraud and Elder Abuse works aggressively to investigate and prosecute those who rob taxpayers of millions of dollars each year and divert scarce health care resources from the needy. The DMFEA is funded via an $18.6 million federal grant program. The Division conducts statewide investigations and prosecutes fraud relating to the activities of medical providers receiving funding under the Medi-Cal system. The section also reviews and prosecutes reports of elder abuse and neglect of patients housed in federally funded nursing home facilities.

Appeals, Writs and Trials Section
The Appeals, Writs and Trials Section handles post-conviction proceedings. This involves prosecuting felony criminal appeals in state court, responding to petitions for writs of habeas corpus in state and federal courts, and prosecuting death penalty appeals. Deputies also handle criminal investigations, conduct evidentiary hearings, appear in local courts to litigate recusal motions, and prosecute felonies in cases in which the local county district attorney has been recused or otherwise removed from the case. Deputies appear regularly in the California Court of Appeal, California Supreme Court, United States District Court, and Ninth Circuit Court of Appeals, and occasionally in the United States Supreme Court.

Correctional Writs & Appeals Section
The Correctional Writs & Appeals Section represents the state in civil rights actions involving state prisoners. This section also represents the Department of Corrections, Board of Prison Terms, Youth Authority and the Department of Mental Health and their employees in cases regarding policies, practices or conditions of confinement of inmates.

Office of Native American Affairs
The Office of Native American Affairs serves as liaison and addresses justice-related issues for California's Indian citizens who reside on reservations, rancherias and in urban communities for the overall improvement of the quality of life for Indian people.

Financial Fraud and Special Prosecutions Unit
The Financial Fraud and Special Prosecutions Unit investigates and prosecutes complex criminal cases occurring in California, primarily related to financial, securities, mortgage, and environmental fraud; public corruption, including violations of California's Political Reform Act; “underground economy” offenses, including tax and revenue fraud and counterfeiting; transnational organized crime; human trafficking; and crimes within the scope of the Attorney General's Bureau of Children's Justice. Vertical teams of prosecutors, investigators, auditors, and paralegals often work with federal and local authorities on cases involving multi-jurisdictional criminal activity.

Victim Services Unit
The Victim Services Unit leads California's fight toward preserving the rights of crime victims through responsive programs, accessibility of services, and progressive legislation.

Research Advisory Panel
The Research Advisory Panel primarily seeks to ensure the safety and protection of participating human research subjects and adequate security of the controlled substances used in the study. The Panel Members evaluate the scientific validity of each proposed project, and may reject proposals where the research is poorly conceived, would produce conclusions of little scientific value, or would not justify the exposure of California subjects to the risk of research.

Division of Civil Law

The Division of Civil Law "both prosecutes and defends civil actions." The overall mission of the Civil Law Division is to provide skilled legal services to state agencies and officials in trial and appellate litigation which includes prosecuting and defending matters in state and federal courts and before various administrative tribunals.

Division of Public Rights

The Division of Public Rights is involved with "safeguarding the state's environmental and natural resources," "preventing fraudulent business practices," and other responsibilities

In the Media

 In the televised 1995 trial of O. J. Simpson, two forensic chemist from CA DOJ, Gary Sims and Renee Montgomery, testified providing expert testimony.
 A fictional unit within CA DOJ operating under the California Bureau of Investigation (CBI), was featured for seven seasons in the television series The Mentalist. This unit of CBI focused mostly on the investigation of homicides, and occasionally kidnappings or missing persons. The Region 1 DVD release of the fourth season of The Mentalist includes the special CBI: Behind the Badge, featuring interaction with actual law enforcement officers in California, specifically focusing on a homicide task force with several agents and officers of different agencies (including those from CBI), who tutored those who worked on the program in providing a realistic portrayal.
 A CBI Special Agent was also featured in a third-season episode of the crime television series Numb3rs, where the CBI agent worked together with the FBI to catch a murderous cult leader.
 Beginning in 2008 (with the most recent written in 2016), New York Times best selling author Jeffery Deaver wrote a series of crime drama novels starring the fictional Special Agent Kathryn Dance of the CA DOJ/CBI.

See also

Federal Counter-Parts
 United States Department of Justice (DOJ)
 United States Marshals Service (USMS)
 United States Department of Justice Office of the Inspector General (DOJ-OIG)
 United States Federal Bureau of Investigation (FBI)
 United States Drug Enforcement Administration (DEA)
 United States Bureau of Alcohol, Tobacco, Firearms and Explosives (ATF)

Additional Information
 State Bureau of Investigation
 Federal law enforcement in the United States

References

External links

Law in the California Code of Regulations
OpenJustice, criminal justice data from the California Department of Justice

Justice